Joslin may refer to;

People
Joslin (surname)

Places
Joslin, South Australia
Joslin, Illinois

Other uses
Joslins, a defunct department store in Denver, Colorado
The Joslin's Canadian Open, the largest grappling tournament in Canada
Joslin Diabetes Center, the world's largest diabetes research center, diabetes clinic, and provider of diabetes education 
Elliott P. Joslin, an American physician, founder of the Joslin Diabetes Center, Boston, MA
Elliott P. Joslin Camps for Children with Diabetes Massachusetts based provider of diabetes education, treatment, and support with recreation, sports, and camping
Joslin Dry Goods Company Building (also known as the Tritch Building or the Joslin Building), a historic building in downtown Denver, Colorado

See also
Jocelyn